The Robert Morris Colonials women represent Robert Morris University in CHA women's ice hockey during the 2020-21 NCAA Division I women's ice hockey season, the 16th overall in program history. Qualifying for the 2021 NCAA National Collegiate Women's Ice Hockey Tournament, the program ranked as the #8 seed.

The Colonials' five-girl senior class featured Emily Curlett, named an assistant captain, and Emilie Harley as well as forwards Anjelica Diffendal, Lexi Templeman, who served in the role of team captain, and goaltender Molly Singewald.

During the first period of a January 30, 2021 tilt versus the Rochester Institute of Technology Tigers, team captain Lexi Templeman recorded the first natural hat trick of her career, part of a four-point offensive outburst in a 7-0 shutout win. It marked the first natural hat trick scored by a Colonials skater since Michaela Boyle achieved the feat on November 24, 2019. 

On Senior Night, celebrated on February 20, 2021, goaltender Molly Singewald made her first career start. A member of the Colonials Class of 2021, she recorded a shutout victory. 

Making their fifth consecutive appearance in the CHA championship game, Gillian Thompson would score the game’s only goal, while Raygan Kirk recorded 36 saves in a tightly contested 1-0 victory on March 6 versus the Syracuse Orange, resulting in their third playoff crown.

Offseason

Recruiting

Standings

Roster

2020–21 Colonials

2020-21 schedule
Source:

|-
!colspan=12 style=" background:#0a2351; "| Regular Season

|-
!colspan=12 style=" background:#0a2351; "| College Hockey America Tournament

|-
!colspan=12 style=" background:#0a2351; "| NCAA Tournament

Awards and honors
Emily Curlett, All-USCHO.com Third Team
Molly Singewald, CHA Goaltender of the Week (awarded February 22) 
Lexi Templeman, College Hockey America Player of the Week (awarded February 1)
Lexi Templeman, CHA First Team All-Star

References

Robert Morris
Robert Morris Lady Colonials ice hockey seasons
Robert
Robert